Andrei Kureichik (Belarusian Андрэй Уладзіміравіч Курэйчык; born January 14, 1980) is a Belarusian screenwriter, playwright, director, and publicist.

Biography 
Kureichik was born in Minsk. In his youth, he was trained by his father in Wushu and won the Minsk championship in 1992. He graduated from BSU Lyceum and then continued his studies at Belarusian State University (BSU) School of Law.  As a sophomore at BSU, he had multiple part-time jobs, including scanning fingerprints in a forensic center and working in a law firm. Kureichik graduated from BSU with honors, specializing in administrative law and political science. He further completed the postgraduate program at BSU Department of Journalism and the film director's internship at the Chekhov Moscow Art Theater (2002) under the supervision of Oleg Tabakov, the People's Artist of the USSR.

From 2001 to 2002, Kureichik worked as a lawyer at Vlasova and Partners, an international law firm. He was also an assistant to the chairman of the Belarusian Union of Theater Workers fulfilling the responsibilities of press secretary and head of multiple art projects. Since 2002, he has authored over 150 articles as a commentator at Belorusskaya Gazeta, a top weekly political and economic newspaper.  Kureichik also served as editor-in-chief of the National Television (ONT) and was on the creative team of the sociopolitical talk show Choice.

At the age of 21, he staged a play at the Chekhov Moscow Art Theater. The play Paradise Lost directed by Kureichik premiered on the Yanka Kupala National Academic Theater stage on 9 November 2002. On 21 June 2003, the Chekhov Moscow Art Theater hosted another premiere under Kureichik's direction, The Piedmont Beast, which became one of the winners in the contemporary play competition  established by Oleg Tabakov together with the Ministry of Culture of the Russian Federation. This play was later staged in many other theaters, repeatedly in the Mayakovsky Theater. Since 2007, Kureichik has been working as a screenwriter in the cinema industry.

In 2003, he worked as an editor of Hotel of Desires Fulfillment, the first Belarusian television series. The Center for Contemporary Drama and Directing was founded by Kureichik within the Belarusian State Academy of Arts; the Center produced several performances and events. As an art director, he also established the International Festival of Contemporary Theater Open Format, the largest theater festival in Belarus.

In 2004, Kureichik did an internship for managing non-profit organizations that was sponsored by the US Department of State. He also acted as an art director of Diva Belaya Rus, a commercial festival of Belarusian women that was held at the Palace of the Republic. He was invited to teach theatrical disciplines at the BSU Lyceum. Later, he created the radio program Theatrical Intermission with Andrei Kureichik on the national radio Culture and taught at the directing department of the Russian Academy of Theater Arts GITIS. In 2006, he was editor-in-chief of the Vestnik Kultury newspaper.

In 2007, Kureichik moved from Minsk, Belarus, to the village where his parents came from, near Smilovichi, and wrote the script for the film Love-Carrot-2. In 2010, he returned to Minsk with his family. His wife, Olga, is an actress at the Kupalovsky Theater and has played in Memorial Prayer, Pavlinka, and several other performances. In 2012, together with Dmitry Friga, Director Dmitry Marinin, and cameramen Alexei Korneev, Artyom Yakimov, and Nikita Pinigin, he founded the creative group Bez Buslou Arts.

By 30 years old, Kureichik had written 25 plays that were staged in 9 countries. By the age of 35, he had carried out 15 film projects. Kureichik is a member of the Belarusian Literary Union Polotsk Branch and is on the jury of the literary prize committee named after Simeon Polotsky. He is a member of the Republican Public Council for Culture and Arts under the Council of Ministers. The total revenue generated from the films with his scripts amounted to 62 million dollars.

Kureichik gives master classes in different countries. He has also taught screenwriting at several universities in Russia, Belarus, and Lithuania.

In May 2020, during the 2020 Belarusian Presidential election campaign, he proposed a plan for changing the government without an election and a revolution. He suggested to the contender for the presidency of the Republic of Belarus, Viktor Babariko, to create an organization or a party that would unite supporters of changes during the presidential election campaign. On 17 August 2020, he became a member of the core committee of the Coordination Council to ensure the transfer of power in the Republic of Belarus.

As of August 2021, Kureichik was living in Helsinki, Finland.

In August 2021, Kureichik received direct death threats from agents of Lukashenko regime.

Filmography

Director and screenwriter 

 Love Carrot (2007)
 Love Carrot 2 (2008)
 Syomin (2009)
 Yulenka (2009)
 Christmas Trees (2010)
 Deadly Combat (2010)
 Syomin. Retribution (2011)
 Office Romance. Present Times (2011)

 I Will Wait (2012)
 Military Intelligence. First Strike (2012)
 Higher Than Sky (2012)
 Odessa-mama (2012)
 Petrovich (2012)
 No Right of Choice (2013)
 Vasilina Ivanovna Changes Profession (2014)
 Horoscope for Luck (2014)
 War of the Sexes (2015)
 GaraSh (2015)
 SOS, Santa Claus, or Everything Will Come True (2015)
 PARTY-ZAN Film (2016)
 Moving Up (2017)
 Our Children (2018)
 Ghouls (2019)

Films (actor) 

 Occupation. Mysteries (2003, Schneider)
 Dunechka (2005, the author of the play)
 Love-Carrot (2007, art critic)

Plays 

 Confession of Pilate (2000, staged at the Theater-Studio of the Belarusian State University)
 Piedmont Beast (2001, staged at the People's Theater in Mosty and the Yanka Kupala National Academic Theatre)
 Paradise Lost (2002, staged at the Yanka Kupala National Academic Theatre; 2003, staged at the Chekov Moscow Art Theater)
 Three Giselles (2005, staged at the New Drama Theater (Minsk); 2004, was awarded a prize at the prestigious international competition Eurasia-2004)
 Kindergarten No. ... (2011, staged at the Center for Contemporary Drama)
 How to Become Immortal (2014, staged at the Donetsk Academic Regional Russian Drama Theater, Mariupol)
 Submariners (a documentary about the events of 4 July 1961 on the Soviet nuclear submarine K-19)
 Insulted. Russia (2017, staged at the Republican Theater of Belarusian Drama; a look at the current situation in Russia and the post-Soviet space
 Beware, women! 
 Muravyov. Count Amursky (2017, staged at the Khabarovsk Regional Drama Theater; a historical drama about the Governor-General of Eastern Siberia Nikolai Muravyov-Amursky)
 Bay of Happiness. Admiral Nevelskoy (2018, staged at the Khabarovsk Regional Drama Theater; a historical drama about the explorer of the Far East, Russian Admiral Gennady Nevelskoy)
 Gender Freaks (2019,  staged at the Republican Theater of Belarusian Drama)
 Insulted. Belarus (2020, staged at the Kyiv Wild Theater (directed by Maksim Golenko) as part of an international project of global solidarity with the Belarusian theater; dedicated to the theme of the political crisis in Belarus after the 2020 presidential election. The prototypes are Alexander Lukashenko and his youngest son Nikolai, Svetlana Tikhonovskaya, Alexander Taraikovsky, Maria Kolesnikova and other real-life personalities. The play has been produced in over 100 venues around the world as part of the Insulted. Belarus Worldwide Readings Project.
 Voices of the New Belarus (2021, a verbatim play consisting of monologues of 15 individuals who suffered indignity, torture and/or death at the hands of Belarusian special forces during or after the 2020 revolution).

Awards 

 Piedmont Beast won the competition organized by the Ministry of Culture of Russia and the Chekov Moscow Art Theater as the best contemporary play in 2002; 
 Charter of the Blind and Illusion were shortlisted for the 2002 Debut Award in the Drama category;
 Old Senor won the competition of the Ministry of Culture of Belarus as the best contemporary play in 2003;
 Paradise Lost (directed by V. Raevsky and performed by the Yanka Kupala National Academic Theatre actors) was recognized as the best production of the International Theater Festival in Chernigov (Ukraine);
 Nocturne and Kindergarten were mentioned by the jury of the 2003 Debut Literary Award;
 At the International Festival of Literature and Culture Slavic Traditions - 2011 (where Kureichik was also a member of the jury), he was awarded a diploma of the Writers' Union of Russia;
 Above the Sky received a special prize of the jury of the 2012 Russian Professional Film Production Award SHOT! (Russian: СНЯТО!) for its screenplay;
 PARTY-ZAN received a special award in the category of Cinematic Versatility at the XVIII Open Russian Comedy Film Festival (2017) Smile, Russia!;
 Moving Up was nominated for the 2019 Golden Eagle Award for the best screenplay;
 Insulted. Russia (directed by Sergei Pavlyuk) received an award for Best Director at the XII International Festival MILK (2019, Ukraine).

References

External links
 
 
 Insulted. Belarus(sia)
 Insulted. Belarus(sia) by Andrei Kureichik
 Theatre life of Belarus from Batleika to performances
 Ryzhkov L., Kureichik A. Lyubov-Morkov. - Moscow: Helios, 2007.
 Andrey Kureychik - IMDb

Bibliography 
 Charter of the Blind; Illusion // Childhood of the century. Prose, drama. A. Kureychik. - M .: R. Elinin Publishing House, 2003.
 Skorina: Selected plays // A. Kureychik. - Minsk: LLC "Magic Book", Ed. Varaksin AN, 2006.

Belarusian dramatists and playwrights
Belarusian screenwriters
Russian screenwriters
Belarusian film directors
Russian film directors
Living people
1980 births